Siri Worm (born 20 April 1992) is a Dutch football defender who plays for Eredivisie club PSV and the senior Netherlands women's national football team.

Club career

Twente
Worm emerged from the youth academy of FC Twente. After several seasons as a reserve or utility player, she secured a place in the team at left back during the 2012–13 season, during which FC Twente were league champions and qualified for the UEFA Women's Champions League. FC Twente qualified for the Champions League 3 more times during Worm's tenure with the club.

Everton
Worm transferred to Everton in July 2017, part of a double transfer with teammate Marthe Munsterman.

Tottenham Hotspur
Following their promotion to the Women's Super League, in July 2019 Worm was announced as one of seven new Tottenham Hotspur signings.

Worm was released by Tottenham at the end of the 2020/21 FA Women's Super League season.

Eintracht Frankfurt
After four years in England Worm moved to Germany to play for Eintracht Frankfurt in the German Frauen-Bundesliga

PSV
One year later she signed a 2-year deal to play for PSV Eindhoven in her native country.

International career
She was the captain of the Dutch Under-19 national team in the 2010 and 2011 U-19 European Championships.

In October 2012 coach Roger Reijners called Worm up to the senior national team, as a replacement for the injured Petra Hogewoning. She won her first cap on 25 November 2012, in a 2–0 friendly win over Wales.

Worm was named in the Netherlands squad for UEFA Women's Euro 2013 in Sweden. She made a substitute appearance in the 1–0 defeat to Norway, replacing established left back Claudia van den Heiligenberg for the last 30 minutes. In April 2019, Worm was named as one of seven players on the Netherlands' standby list for the 2019 FIFA Women's World Cup.

International goals
Scores and results list the Netherlands goal tally first.

Honours

Club
FC Twente
 Eredivisie (2): 2010–11, 2015–16
 BeNe League (2): 2012–13, 2013–14
 KNVB Women's Cup (1): 2014–15

International
Dutch Senior Team
Algarve Cup: 2018

References

External links
Profile at Onsoranje.nl (in Dutch)
Profile at onsorange.nl 
Profile at vrouwenvoetbalnederland.nl (in Dutch)

1992 births
Living people
People from Doetinchem
Dutch women's footballers
Netherlands women's international footballers
Dutch expatriate sportspeople in Germany
Expatriate women's footballers in England
Dutch expatriate sportspeople in England
Eredivisie (women) players
Women's Super League players
FC Twente (women) players
Everton F.C. (women) players
Women's association football defenders
Tottenham Hotspur F.C. Women players
Dutch expatriate women's footballers
1. FFC Frankfurt players
PSV (women) players
Eintracht Frankfurt (women) players
Expatriate women's footballers in Germany
Footballers from Gelderland